Brian Andrew Dunning (born 1965) is an American writer and producer who focuses on science and skepticism. He has hosted a weekly podcast, Skeptoid, since 2006, and he is an author of a series of books on the subject of scientific skepticism, some of which are based on the podcast. Skeptoid has been the recipient of several podcast awards such as the Parsec Award. Dunning has also created the Skeptoid.org spin-off video series, inFact, and The Feeding Tube both available on YouTube.

Dunning has produced two educational films on the subject of critical thinking: Here Be Dragons in 2008, and Principles of Curiosity in 2017.

Dunning co-founded Buylink, a business-to-business service provider, in 1996, and served at the company until 2002. He later became eBay's second biggest affiliate marketer; he has since been convicted of wire fraud through a cookie stuffing scheme. In August 2014, he was sentenced to 15 months in prison, followed by three years of supervised release for the company obtaining between $200,000 and $400,000 through wire fraud.

Career

Buylink
In 1996 Dunning co-founded and was chief technology officer for Buylink Corporation. Buylink received venture capital funding from Hummer Winblad Venture Partners. In 2000 he participated in a presentation on Buylink at The Berkeley Entrepreneurs Forum called Bricks to Clicks in the New Internet Reality. He discussed the company on CNNfn's Market Call, in Rhonda Schaffler's Maverick of the Morning segment. In 2002, Dunning left his position as CTO of BuyLink.

Between 1997 and 2005 he was technical editor for FileMaker Advisor Magazine, and contributing editor of ISO FileMaker Magazine, 1996–2002, winning one of the FileMaker Excellence Awards at the 2001 FileMaker Developers Conference.

Skeptical activism
Beginning in 2006, Dunning hosted and produced Skeptoid, a weekly audio podcast dedicated "to furthering knowledge by blasting away the widespread pseudosciences that infect popular culture, and replacing them with way cooler reality." He is also the author of the book of the same title and a sequel.

Beginning in 2007, Dunning periodically released video episodes of his InFact series. Each episode is under four minutes long and covers issues similar to those explored in more depth in the Skeptoid podcast, but is intended to reach a wider audience due to its brevity and availability on YouTube.

In 2008 Dunning produced Here Be Dragons, a free 40 minute video introduction to critical thinking intended for general audiences, and received an award from the Portland Humanist Film Festival for this in November 2011.

In 2010 Dunning was awarded the Parsec Award for "Best Fact Behind the Fiction Podcast". In August 2010 he received an award recognizing his contributions in the skeptical field from the Independent Investigations Group (IIG) during its 10th Anniversary Gala.

In June 2017 Dunning's second film, Principles of Curiosity, was released. According to Dunning, this "presents a general introduction to the foundations of scientific skepticism and critical thinking... It is nonprofit, noncommercial, and licensed for free public and private screenings. It is provided with free educational materials for teachers, designed for high school through college. It is suitable for all audiences. Its 40-minute runtime should fit into most classes."

In October 2019, a special preview of the Skeptoid Media documentary, Science Friction, was shown after CSICon in Las Vegas. Through a series of interviews, the film addresses the issue of scientists and skeptics being misrepresented by the media. Produced by Dunning and directed by filmmaker and comedian Emery Emery, release of the film is scheduled for 2020.

Dunning has written articles for Skepticblog.org, published by The Skeptics Society, and was an executive producer for the unreleased network television pilot The Skeptologists.

Wire fraud case
In August 2008, eBay filed suit against Dunning, accusing him of defrauding eBay and eBay affiliates in a cookie stuffing scheme for his company, Kessler's Flying Circus. In June 2010, based on the same allegations and following an investigation by the Federal Bureau of Investigation, a grand jury indicted Dunning on charges of wire fraud. On April 15, 2013, in the San Jose, California, U.S. District Court, as part of a plea agreement, Dunning pleaded guilty to wire fraud. The eBay civil suit was dismissed in May 2014 after the parties came to an agreement, while Dunning was sentenced in August 2014 to fifteen months in prison as a result of his company receiving between $200,000 and $400,000 in fraudulent commissions from eBay.

In a statement on his website, Dunning insists that he is innocent, claiming he only agreed to the settlement because he could not afford to continue the legal battle.

Skeptoid podcasts

Skeptoid is Dunning's weekly podcast. The show follows an audio essay format, and is dedicated to the critical examination of pseudoscience and the paranormal. In May 2012, Skeptoid Media became a 501(c)(3) educational nonprofit.

Along with similarly themed Point of Inquiry, Skepticality: The Official Podcast of Skeptic Magazine, and The Skeptics' Guide to the Universe, it is listed on an iTunes (US) web page of popular science and medicine podcasts. In May 2014, Skeptoid’s website reported that the podcast had a weekly average of 161,000 downloads.

Each roughly ten-minute Skeptoid episode focuses on a single issue that is generally pseudoscientific in nature. Transcriptions of the episodes are available on line, and usually fall into one of four categories:
 Quackery medical modalities: such as homeopathy, reflexology, detoxification, or chiropractic
 Popular cultural misconceptions: such as organic foods, SUVs, and global warming
 Urban legends: such as crop circles, the Amityville Horror, the Phoenix Lights, or the Philadelphia Experiment
 Religion and mythology: such as creation legends, New Age religions, and concepts of sin

Beginning in 2007, Dunning authored a series of books based upon the Skeptoid podcast episodes.

Despite his shift away from the technology industry, Dunning continues to do computer programming, and does web development for his Skeptoid website.

From 2022, the show is distributed by public media organization PRX's Dovetail publishing platform; PRX also provides sponsorship and promotional support.

Skeptoid honors
Skeptoid was a 2009 Podcast Awards finalist in the Education category.

In 2010, Skeptoid won the Parsec Award for "Best Fact Behind the Fiction" podcast. Also in 2010, Skeptoid was recognized for "Outstanding Contribution to Science and Skepticism" by the Independent Investigations Group (IIG).

Publications

Filmography 
Dunning was co-writer (with Emery Emery) of Science Friction, a documentary on how scientists are misrepresented in the media. It was released on Amazon Prime Video in 2022 and starred Matt Kirshen, Janine Kippner, Simon Singh, Banachek, Steven Novella, Michael Shermer, Richard Dawkins, Ben Radford, Zubin Damania, and Ken Feder amongst other scientists.

References

External links
 Official Website
 Skeptoid Media
 Skeptoid Official website
 
 

1965 births
Living people
American male bloggers
American bloggers
American podcasters
American male writers
American science writers
American skeptics
Critics of alternative medicine
Critics of parapsychology
Science podcasts
American people convicted of mail and wire fraud
People from Laguna Niguel, California
American chief technology officers
21st-century American non-fiction writers
Ohlone College alumni